The Society for the Prevention of Cruelty to Animals, Selangor, Malaysia (SPCA Selangor) is a non-profit animal shelter in Selangor, Malaysia that aims to help animals that cannot defend themselves.  The SPCA Selangor was founded by Ruth Spiers in 1958.

SPCA Selangor receives almost 1,100 animals ranging from dogs to rabbits every month.  Due to shortage of space and funding, and a 10 percent adoption rate, SPCA Selangor must euthanize many animals each year.  The SPCA Selangor aims to become a no-kill facility by 2010.

In addition to operating animal shelters, SPCA Selangor educates the public about responsible pet ownership, lobbies for animal protection and animal control laws,  spays and neuters animals, and investigates animal cruelty complaints.

Currently, SPCA Selangor is working to persuade the local government to increase the fine for animal abusers. This campaign came about when a dog breeder in Cheras was found guilty of abusing 13 of his dogs and fined RM200.  In another case, Tim, a Dachshund, had its chain wrapped so tightly around its neck that the chain had become embedded into the skin, causing it to suffer a bloody six-inch wound around its neck. Its owner got a fine of RM200 and was put in jail for one day.  

In response, these and other punishments which SPCA Selangor felt were insufficient, SPCA came up with a petition and is appealing to the courts and the law makers to increase the maximum fine of RM200 and/or six months of imprisonment under The Animal Ordinance 1953 to a fine of RM100,000.

See also 
 Animal welfare and rights in Malaysia

References

External links
 http://www.spca.org.my Selangor SPCA

1958 establishments in Malaya
Animal welfare organisations based in Malaysia